The 1988 Texas Longhorns football team represented the University of Texas at Austin in the 1988 NCAA Division I-A football season.  The Longhorns finished the season with a 4–7 record.

Schedule

Personnel

Season summary

at BYU

New Mexico

North Texas

at Rice

vs Oklahoma

Arkansas

at Texas Tech

Houston

at TCU

at Baylor

at Texas A&M

References

Texas
Texas Longhorns football seasons
Texas Longhorns football